The Texas-Temple Sportsman  is an American-built light single-seat high-wing sporting monoplane of the late 1920s.

Design and development
The Texas Aero Corporation of Temple, Texas was formed about 1927 to construct passenger and mail light aircraft. The companies origin can be traced back to George W Williams Texas Aero Manufacturing Company of 1911. It built a series of aircraft designs including the Texas-Temple Sportsman.
  
The Sportsman was a parasol winged monoplane, equipped with two seats arranged in tandem.  The cockpit had an open layout.  A fixed tail-wheel undercarriage was fitted. The tailplane was set low on the fin.  A 100 h.p. Cirrus III was initially fitted.

Operational history

Three examples of the Sportsman were completed: NC480 manufacturers number 1; NC852H and N987N manufacturers number 107. There was no N987N registered in FAA records at the time, so it is likely to be from a later registration. There was an NC987H, but that was the registration for a different make of aircraft, a Smith S-1 with a Velie engine.  The Sportsman was suitable for operation by individual sporting pilots. Williams was killed during 1930 in the crash while flying with a trainee pilot. The company folded after the accident.

Surviving aircraft

The third Sportsman  survived the Second World War and was rebuilt in 1990 by J.D. Ferrel with a radial engine of unknown manufacture. It is still extant, but without a valid permit to fly. N987N is publicly displayed (2007) in the Frontiers of Flight Museum at Dallas (Love Field) airport.

Specifications 

Not available.  The aircraft was originally fitted with a 100 h.p. ADC Cirrus III engine.

References

Notes

Bibliography

1920s United States civil utility aircraft
Single-engined tractor aircraft
High-wing aircraft
Aircraft first flown in 1928